Amal Kanti Chakraborty was the Sheriff of Kolkata for the year 2006. He is a paediatrician in the city of Kolkata, West Bengal, India. As a paediatric surgeon, he heads the department of paediatrics in Ramakrishna Mission Seva Sadan hospital.

References

Medical doctors from Kolkata
Living people
Sheriffs of Kolkata
Indian paediatricians
Year of birth missing (living people)